USS Reid (FFG-30), twenty-second ship of the  of guided-missile frigates, was named for Sailing Master Samuel Chester Reid (1783–1861).

Ordered from Todd Pacific Shipyards, Los Angeles Division, San Pedro, California on 23 January 1978 as part of the FY78 program, Reid was laid down on 8 October 1980, launched on 27 June 1981, sponsored by Mrs. William C. Abhau, her daughter Miss Elliot Abhau assisting, Mrs. Abhau is the great-great-granddaughter of Sailing Master Chester Reid, and commissioned on 19 February 1983.

On 18 August 1990, Reid fired the first shots of Operation Desert Shield when she fired across the bow of an Iraqi tanker who had refused to change course when ordered.

The Reid's unofficial nickname Reidski, used during the 1980s, came into use as Reid found herself, more often than not, playing on the side of the "orange" team during fleet exercises.

TCG Gelibolu (F 493) 
Decommissioned and stricken on 25 September 1998, she was transferred to Turkey on 5 January 1999 as that nation's TCG Gelibolu (F 493). As of 2013, she is still in active service.

References

External links 

MaritimeQuest USS Reid FFG-30 pages

 

Oliver Hazard Perry-class frigates of the United States Navy
Ships built in Los Angeles
Gulf War ships of the United States
1981 ships
Ships transferred from the United States Navy to the Turkish Navy